Insatiable may refer to:

Music 
 Insatiable (album) (2010), by Nadine Coyle
 "Insatiable" (Prince song)  (1992)  
 "Insatiable" (Darren Hayes song) (2002)
 "Insatiable" (Elise Estrada song) (2007) 
 "Insatiable" (Nadine Coyle song), title track and lead single

Other 
 Insatiable (film), a 1980 American pornographic film starring Marilyn Chambers
 Insatiable (TV series), a 2018 Netflix TV series
 The Insatiable (2006), American vampire horror film
 Diario de una ninfómana (2008), Spanish film, released in the US and Britain as Insatiable - Diary of a Nymphomaniac
 Insatiable (novel) (2003), memoir by Valérie Tasso
 "Insatiable" (Warehouse 13), an episode of the TV series Warehouse 13